Polyvalente Louis-J.-Robichaud is a Francophone high school in Shediac, New Brunswick, Canada. The school was named after the first elected Acadian premier of New Brunswick Louis J. Robichaud.

External links
 LJR School Site

High schools in New Brunswick
Education in Westmorland County, New Brunswick